Constantine Palaiologos or Palaeologus (died 1271) was a Byzantine nobleman and the younger half-brother of the Byzantine Emperor Michael VIII Palaiologos.

Life and career 
Constantine was born ca. 1230, to Andronikos Palaiologos, Grand domestic of the Empire of Nicaea and his unknown second wife.

The life of Constantine is unknown until 1259, when he was appointed Caesar by his elder half-brother, Michael VIII. The following year, he was also created a sebastokrator. He commanded the Byzantine forces on an unsuccessful campaign against the Latin Principality of Achaea, where his army was routed at the Battle of Prinitza. However, Constantine had already left the region by the time of the major Byzantine defeat at the Battle of Makryplagi in 1263/1264.

Sometime after returning from the campaign against the Principality of Achaea, Constantine became a monk under the name Kallinikos. He died in 1271.

Marriage and family 
Constantine was married c. 1259/60 to Irene Komnene Laskarina Branaina, by whom he seems to have had five children"

 Michael Komnenos Branas Palaiologos
 Andronikos Branas Doukas Angelos Palaiologos
 Maria Komnene Branaina Laskarina Doukaina Tornikina Palaiologina. Married Isaac Komnenos Doukas Tornikios.
 Theodora. Married John Komnenos Doukas Angelos Synadenos and had three children. Later became a nun under the name Theodoule.
 Daughter (name unknown). Married Smilets of Bulgaria.

Footnotes

References 
 George Pachymeres, De Michaele Palaeologo & Andronicus Palæologus
 George Acropolites, Annals

 Hooper, N. & Bennett, M., The Cambridge Illustrated Atlas of Warfare (Cambridge University Press, 1996) , 
 'Typikon of Theodora Synadene for the Convent of the Mother of God Bebaia Elpis in Constantinople' (trans. Alice-Mary Talbot), from Byzantine Monastic Foundation Documents: A Complete Translation of the Surviving Founder's Typika and Testaments, Thomas, J. & Hero, A.C. (eds.) (Dumbarton Oaks Research Library and Collection, Washington D.C. 2000)

Constantine Palaiologos
13th-century Byzantine people
1230s births
1271 deaths
People of the Empire of Nicaea
Eastern Orthodox monks
Sebastokrators
Caesars (Byzantine nobles)
Michael VIII Palaiologos